The Coupe de Madagascar is the top knockout tournament in Malagasy football. It was created in 1974.

Winners 
1974: Fortior Mahajanga 
1975: Fortior Mahajanga
1976: Fortior Mahajanga
1977: Fortior Mahajanga
1978: AS Sotema
1979: AS Sotema
1980: AS St. Michel
1981: Dinamo Fima
1982: AS Sotema
1983: Dinamo Fima
1984: unknown
1985: Fortior Mahajanga
1986: HTMF
1987: FC BTM
1988: FC BFV
1989: FC BTM
1990: FC BFV
1991: FC BTM
1992: COSFAP
1993: AS Cimelta
1994: unknown
1995: unknown
1996: Club S
1997: unknown
1998: FC Djivan 2-0 Fortior Mahajanga
1999: FC Djivan 3-0 Akon'Ambatomena
2000: FC Djivan 1-0 FC Jirama  
2001: US Transfoot 1-0 AS Fortior
2002: AS Fortior 3-0 US Transfoot    
2003: Léopards de Transfoot 1-0 SO l'Emyrne
2004: USJF Ravinala 2-1 USCA Foot
2005: USCA Foot 2-1 (a.p.) USJF Ravinala
2006: Ajesaia 1-0 USCA Foot
2007: AS ADEMA 1-0 USCA Foot
2008: AS ADEMA 1-0 Iarivo FC
2009: AS ADEMA 2-1 Tana FC Formation
2010: AS ADEMA 1-0 (aet) Japan Actuel's FC
2011: CNaPS Sport 1-1 (5-4 a.p. tab.) Tana FC Formation
2012: TCO Boeny 1-0 AS ADEMA
2013: ASSM Elgeco Plus 3-2 AS ADEMA
2014: ASSM Elgeco Plus (aet) 3-2 AS ADEMA
2015: CNaPS Sport 2-0 AS ADEMA
2016: CNaPS Sport 2-1 ASSM Elgeco Plus
2017: Fosa Juniors FC 2-1 COSFA Analamanga
2018: ASSM Elgeco Plus 2-1 AS ADEMA

References

External links

Football competitions in Madagascar
National association football cups